Edward Kasner (April 2, 1878 – January 7, 1955) was an American mathematician who was appointed Tutor on Mathematics in the Columbia University Mathematics Department. Kasner was the first Jewish person appointed to a faculty position in the sciences at Columbia University. Subsequently, he became an adjunct professor in 1906, and a full professor in 1910, at the university. Differential geometry was his main field of study. In addition to introducing the term "googol", he is known also for the Kasner metric and the Kasner polygon.

Education
Kasner's 1899 PhD dissertation at Columbia University was titled The Invariant Theory of the Inversion Group: Geometry upon a Quadric Surface; it was published by the American Mathematical Society in 1900 in their Transactions.

Googol and googolplex 
Kasner is perhaps best remembered today for introducing the term "googol." In order to pique the interest of children, Kasner sought a name for a very large number: one followed by 100 zeros.  On a walk in the New Jersey Palisades with his nephews, Milton (1911–1981) and Edwin Sirotta, Kasner asked for their ideas. Nine-year-old Milton suggested "googol".

In 1940, with James R. Newman, Kasner co-wrote a non-technical book surveying the field of mathematics, called Mathematics and the Imagination. It was in this book that the term "googol" was first popularized:

The Internet search engine "Google" originated from a misspelling of "googol", and the "Googleplex" (the Google company headquarters in Mountain View, California) is similarly derived from googolplex.

Personal life
Kasner was Jewish and was the son of Austrian immigrants.

Works
 
 
 
 Edward Kasner and James R. Newman, Mathematics and the Imagination, Tempus Books of Microsoft Press, 1989.

References

External links
 History from the Google website
 

1878 births
1955 deaths
Jewish American scientists
Differential geometers
19th-century American mathematicians
20th-century American mathematicians
City College of New York alumni
Columbia University alumni
Columbia University faculty